The Truman Bulldogs are the sports teams of Truman State University, located in Kirksville, Missouri, United States. They participate in the NCAA's Division II and in the Great Lakes Valley Conference (GLVC), joining the conference in 2013 after having been a member of the Mid-America Intercollegiate Athletics Association (MIAA) since that league's creation in 1912.

Sports
Truman State sponsors 16 varsity sports, including seven men's sports and nine women's sports. In 2018, the university cut men's tennis and wrestling due to budget cuts enacted by the Missouri state government.

Men's sports
 Baseball
 Basketball
 Cross Country
 Football
 Soccer
 Swimming
 Track & Field

Women's sports
 Basketball
 Cross Country
 Golf
 Soccer
 Softball
 Swimming
 Tennis
 Track & Field
 Volleyball

Football

National championships
The Bulldogs have won seven team NCAA national championships, all at the Division II level.

Team

Mascot
The official mascot of Truman State Athletic teams is the Bulldog.

Athletic facilities
 James S. Stokes Stadium is the home of the TSU Bulldog football and track and field teams. Inside the stadium is the Kenneth Gardner Track.
 John J. Pershing Arena It is the home for Bulldog Basketball, Volleyball and Wrestling and also serves as the main practice facility for the Truman Athletics Department.
 Bulldog Softball Park is the site of Truman’s softball field, and is located just south of Stokes Stadium. The softball field was constructed in 1972 and has a seating capacity for 200 spectators. Additional seating can be transported in when necessary.
 Bulldog Baseball Park is the site of Truman’s baseball field, and is located just south of Stokes Stadium.
 Bulldog Soccer Park is home of the Bulldog soccer teams.
 Truman Tennis Courts is home of the Truman Tennis Teams.

References

External links